Sterphus auricaudatus is a species of Hoverfly in the family Syrphidae.

Distribution
Mexico.

References

Eristalinae
Insects described in 1892
Diptera of North America
Hoverflies of North America
Taxa named by Samuel Wendell Williston